"03 Bonnie & Clyde" is a song recorded by American rapper Jay-Z featuring his then-girlfriend, now wife, American singer Beyoncé Knowles. It was released on October 10, 2002. It was composed by Jay-Z, Kanye West, Prince, Tupac Shakur, Darryl Harper, Ricky Rouse and Tyrone Wrice for Jay-Z's seventh studio album The Blueprint 2: The Gift & The Curse (2002). The song was released as the album's lead single on October 10, 2002. "03 Bonnie & Clyde" sampled its beat from American rapper Tupac Shakur's 1996 song "Me and My Girlfriend", paraphrasing its chorus, and was inspired by the crime film Bonnie and Clyde. The instrumentation is based on programmed drums, bass instruments, and a flamenco guitar.

"03 Bonnie & Clyde" was generally received with favorable reviews by music critics, who complimented the combination of Jay-Z's and Beyoncé's musical styles, their collaboration and the song's production. The single reached number four on the Billboard Hot 100, becoming Jay-Z's second top ten single and Beyoncé's first as a solo artist. It charted at number one in Switzerland, number two in the United Kingdom and peaked in the top twenty in other European territories. "03 Bonnie & Clyde" was certified gold by the Recording Industry Association of America (RIAA) and platinum by the Australian Recording Industry Association (ARIA).

The accompanying music video was directed by Chris Robinson, and features Jay-Z and Beyoncé playing a modern-day version of the 1920s bank robbers Clyde Barrow and Bonnie Parker. It was nominated for Best Hip-Hop Video at the 2003 MTV Video Music Awards. "03 Bonnie & Clyde" spawned a feud with American recording artist Toni Braxton, who had also sampled "Me and My Girlfriend" in her 2002 song "Me & My Boyfriend". She accused West and Jay-Z of stealing the idea of using the song as a sample, which was later denied by both of them. "03 Bonnie & Clyde" was performed by Jay-Z and Beyoncé on several television shows and was later included on the set list of their concert performances and tours, most notably on their co-headlining On the Run and On the Run II tours.

Production and release
"03 Bonnie & Clyde" marked the first collaboration between rapper Jay-Z and R&B singer Beyoncé Knowles. While listening to Shakur's The Don Killuminati: The 7 Day Theory, producer Kanye West suggested that American rapper Tupac Shakur's song "Me and My Girlfriend" would make a good sample to use on Jay-Z's duet with Knowles. West told MTV News that Jay-Z had asked him on the telephone for a duet for him and Knowles: "We got this joint, it has to be the best beat you ever made." He continued:

So I went home and called my dog, E Base, who plays a lot of instruments up at Baseline [studio] for me and [producer] Just Blaze. [E] came through. I programmed the drums in 10 minutes, and then he played all the different parts. This version is all live bass, live guitars, [live] chords on it. I brought it to Hov that night, he heard it, he thought of the video treatment before he thought of the rap. He just knew it was gonna be the one.

Tensions arose during the conception of "03 Bonnie & Clyde" over the sampling of "Me and My Girlfriend". Senior Vice President of A&R Tina Davis commented on the issue, "We only had one day to clear the [Tupac Shakur] sample [from 'Me and my Girlfriend'] that was used on "03 Bonnie and Clyde" last year with Jay-Z and Knowles [Beyoncé]. We were back and forth with Afeni Shakur all day until we got the clearance. And then it's a hit."

"03 Bonnie & Clyde" was released on October 10, 2002, as the lead single from Jay-Z's album The Blueprint 2: The Gift & the Curse. Knowles later included the song as a bonus track on international editions of her 2003 debut solo album Dangerously in Love. In 2003, Now That's What I Call Music! included "03 Bonnie & Clyde" as the opening track of the 12th volume of the US release and the fifteenth track of the 54th volume of the UK release. The song's release was the first indication of Jay-Z's and Knowles' romantic status, spawning rumors about a burgeoning relationship. Their relationship was not made public until Jay-Z featured on Knowles' songs "Crazy In Love" (2003) and "Déjà Vu" (2006). The former's release also marked the debut of the solo career of Knowles, leaving Destiny's Child on hiatus.

Composition

"03 Bonnie & Clyde" features drums and live instrumentation such as bass instruments and guitar chords. It also consists of a beat sampled from "Me and My Girlfriend". The song was inspired by the 1967 American crime film Bonnie and Clyde as Jay-Z and Beyoncé proclaim themselves as the current version of the criminal duo. Ethan Brown of New York magazine noted that its patina of flamenco guitar was reminiscent of that in Jay-Z's 2001 collaboration with R. Kelly on "Fiesta." Beyoncé mimics the hook of "Me and My Girlfriend" on the chorus as she sings, "Down to ride to the very end, me and my boyfriend".

Some lyrics sung by Beyoncé were sampled from "If I Was Your Girlfriend" by American recording artist Prince. On the second verse, Jay-Z references the relationship between Bobby Brown and Whitney Houston, and the American television comedy-drama series Sex and the City as he raps: "She riiides wit' me / The new Bobby and Whitney / Only time we don't speak is during 'Sex and the City' / Put us together, how they gon' stop both of us? / When I'm off track, Mommy is keeping me focused". The verse then continues: "Let's lock this down like it's supposed to be/ The new '03 Bonnie and Clyde, Hov and B".

Critical reception
"03 Bonnie & Clyde" was received favorably by critics, who commended the use of different samples, and commented on the relationship between Jay-Z and Beyoncé. Chris Ryan of Spin magazine described "03 Bonnie & Clyde" as a highlight on The Blueprint 2: The Gift & the Curse, stating that it consists of "a house party in a crib as big as the Georgia Dome." John Bush from AllMusic included the song as a highlight on the album, further describing it as "a slick R&B crossover with Beyoncé Knowles". Marc L. Hill of PopMatters viewed it as the "obligatory radio song" of the album. Awarding the song a rating of eight out of ten possible points, Dele Fadele of NME complimented it as "a cool duet" between Jay-Z and Beyoncé. John Robinson of the same publication wrote that as the couple describe their life, it's not all "Lexus and sipping Cris". He added, "A similarly relaxed production makes for a behind-the-diamante-net-curtains classic".

Ethan Brown of New York magazine named "03 Bonnie & Clyde" as a follow-up to the previous "Bonnie & Clyde Part II" by Jay-Z featuring rapper Foxy Brown. Erik Parker, music editor of Vibe magazine, was divided on the song's sample, writing that it was "tasteless but well-executed", and complimented West's production as "impeccable". Margena A. Christian of Jet magazine praised Jay-Z's and Beyoncé's collaboration, favoring the former's "dropping lyrics" and the latter's "cooing silky vocals". Chuck Taylor of Billboard magazine wrote that though it was unclear at the time whether the couple were together or not, but they created good music together. Taylor praised the song's ability to showcase what each artist does best: Jay-Z "spitting" verses of praise, and Beyoncé's sweets coos and hooks. Taylor noted that the sampled acoustic guitar "added spice to the track, setting it up for future success". In a more negative review, Nathan Rabin of The A.V. Club described the song as "terrible" and different from the other songs on The Blueprint 2: The Gift & The Curse.

Rap-Up credited "03 Bonnie & Clyde" for giving Beyoncé a "little street-credit". The staff members of Vibe magazine placed the song at number two on a list of the best Bonnie and Clyde inspired songs. On a list of the 10 Best Jay-Z Songs, Dean Silfenv of AOL placed "03 Bonnie & Clyde" at number six. Popjustice listed "03 Bonnie & Clyde" at number 66 on its list of the best singles of 2003. It was nominated for the Best Collaboration at the 2003 BET Awards, but lost to Snoop Dogg's song "Beautiful". In a 2013 list of Jay-Z's 20 Biggest Billboard Hits, "03 Bonnie & Clyde" was ranked at number 6. Elijah Watson and Erika Ramirez of Billboard magazine noted that the song proved the couple was "unstoppable from jump".

Chart performance
"03 Bonnie & Clyde" reached the top ten on music charts in six European countries. It peaked at number six on the Norway Singles Chart and on the Danish Singles Chart, number eight on the Italian Singles Chart, and topped the Swiss Singles Charts. In Canada, the song peaked at number four and became Jay-Z's highest charting single until it was surpassed by his 2009 Alicia Keys-assisted song "Empire State of Mind", which peaked at number three. In the United Kingdom, "03 Bonnie & Clyde" peaked at number two on the UK Singles Chart. At the time, it became his highest charting single in Britain since "Hard Knock Life (Ghetto Anthem)" achieved the same feat in November 1998. It peaked at number four on the New Zealand Singles Chart, becoming his highest charting single in that territory. The song also became Jay-Z's highest charting single in Australia, where it peaked at number two. "03 Bonnie & Clyde" was certified platinum by the Australian Recording Industry Association (ARIA), denoting shipment of 70,000 copies.

"03 Bonnie & Clyde" broke into the top five of the Billboard Hot 100 at number four; it became the highest-charting single that references the famous bank robbers Bonnie and Clyde. The record was previously held by Georgie Fame's 1967 single "The Ballad of Bonnie and Clyde." Following the performance of "03 Bonnie & Clyde" on Saturday Night Live (SNL) on November 2, 2002, its radio audience increased by 12%, allowing the song to advance into the top ten of the US Hot R&B/Hip-Hop Songs chart, at number seven. This gave Jay-Z his 12th top 10 single, tying him with rapper P. Diddy, who had the same number of top 10 singles on that chart. "03 Bonnie & Clyde" was his first top 10 since his 2001 single "Girls, Girls, Girls". It was certified gold by the Recording Industry Association of America (RIAA), denoting sales of 500,000 copies.The song sold over 1 million copies in US.

Music video 
Chris Robinson directed the song's accompanying music video and filmed in Mexico, during October 2002. June Ambrose was hired as the personal stylist, and Johnathon Schaech and Lance Reddick appear in the video as the police officers on their tail. Jay-Z and Beyoncé play a modern-day version of the 1930s bank robbers Clyde Barrow and Bonnie Parker. The video is loosely based on the American 1993 romance crime film True Romance, which stars Christian Slater and Patricia Arquette as two lovers on the run from cocaine dealers. The choreography used in the clip suggests a relationship beyond screen, as Jay-Z wraps his arm around Beyoncé while singing his part of the chorus. The video also marked a departure for the "clean-cut Beyoncé" and created a symbiotic relationship between her and Jay-Z, allowing them to exchange audiences. The video was premiered on MTV on November 8, 2002.

The music video begins as police officers and Reddick discuss the criminal duo and ways to catch them. As the song begins, Jay-Z is seen driving a gunmetal grey Aston Martin Vanquish while Beyoncé sits in the passenger seat. As they drive through the sepia sands of Mexico, clips of the police from the beginning of the video are cut into the scene. As Jay-Z and Beyoncé pull over to a hotel, they cover the car to avoid notice from the police. As Beyoncé and Jay-Z count money in the bedroom, the police discover their hiding place and go upstairs only to find that the two have fled the scene in their car. Scenes of Beyoncé and Jay-Z at a Mexican bar are inter-cut with scenes of an intimate time in a phone-booth; behind the phone booth, spray-painted onto a wall is a tribute to Tupac Shakur. The duo again elude the police who are following one step behind. After Beyoncé performs her verse in an empty pool, the police form a blockade on the highway in an attempt to catch her and Jay-Z, only to be stumped again as two gas station attendant decoys are found driving the car. The video ends as Beyoncé and Jay-Z light a bonfire on the beach and drive away in a different car.

Corey Moss of MTV News noted that the end of the video does not reveal how the "real" Bonnie and Clyde met their end. The story continues in the 2004 video for Jay-Z's song "99 Problems". The music video for "03 Bonnie & Clyde" was nominated for Best Hip-Hop Video at the 2003 MTV Video Music Awards. In the official top 20 countdown of Jay-Z music videos, MTV UK listed the clip at number 10.

Controversy 

On October 8, 2002, Toni Braxton and her team released a statement claiming that Jay-Z's song "03 Bonnie & Clyde" had stolen Braxton's idea to sample the 1996 Tupac Shakur song "Me and My Girlfriend". Braxton sampled Shakur's song on the track "Me & My Boyfriend", included on Braxton's album, More Than a Woman (2002). In a call to a New York radio station, hosted by Wendy Williams, Braxton stated that "Jay-Z and Beyoncé are messing with my money. They're trying to steal my mojo". Braxton said her song was recorded over the summer of 2002, and alleged that Jay-Z only decided to do "03 Bonnie & Clyde" after she played her version of the song for Def Jam Recordings.

Kanye West responded to Braxton's claim in an interview for MTV News, "I had no idea about Toni Braxton's [song]. She can't act like ain't nobody ever heard 'Me and My Girlfriend' before. People hear the song all the time. I can [understand her complaint] if it [was] an original song." West defended the song's sample, stating that the idea came to him after listening to a friend's Makaveli album one night. Roc-A-Fella Records' Co-CEO Damon Dash responded to Braxton's claims:

Speaking for MTV News, Jay-Z responded to Braxton's claims: "I wouldn't want to take it from her. I don't even think like that. My first thought would be, 'Maybe I could call her up, maybe I could get on that record.' The most obvious [explanation] is it's neither one of our records. It's not like you made an original idea. She's not in hip-hop, but it happens in hip-hop often. We go to sample the same thing and my record came out first. I'm sorry. What can I do?" He went on saying that if he had known they were both planning to sample the same Tupac song, he would have arranged a duet with her.

Live performances
On November 2, 2002, Jay-Z and Beyoncé performed the song together at Saturday Night Live (SNL). Later, on November 21, 2002, they appeared on MTV's TRL for Spankin' New Music Week where they also performed the song. In 2009, Beyoncé performed an abbreviated version of "03 Bonnie & Clyde" during her I Am... Yours revue, held at the Encore Las Vegas Theatre in July and August. The song was later included on the 2009 live album I Am... Yours: An Intimate Performance at Wynn Las Vegas which was chronicling the revue. In August 2011, Beyoncé performed "03 Bonnie & Clyde" again during her revue 4 Intimate Nights with Beyoncé and included the song on the DVD Live at Roseland: Elements of 4 released in November 2011. During the concerts, Beyoncé announced the song by saying, "It's 2002... I started to feel a little lonely till one day...". "03 Bonnie & Clyde" was included on Jay-Z's live album Live in Brooklyn released on October 11, 2012, after he performed the song during eight shows in Brooklyn. In 2013, Jay-Z included the song on the set list of his Legends of the Summer Stadium Tour.

"03 Bonnie & Clyde" was part of the set list of Beyoncé and Jay-Z's co-headlining On the Run Tour (2014) where the shows were opened with the performance of the song. A black-and-white video was shown on the screen accompanied by sirens as the duo appeared onstage surrounded by smoke. They started performing the song with Beyoncé wearing a see-through fishnet mask and Jay-Z wearing black sunglasses, a star-speckled shirt, black jacket and gold chains. The song was in line with the show's overall criminalistic theme. d /54

Formats and track listings 
Digital EP

 "03 Bonnie & Clyde" (Radio Edit, Hey Arnold!: The Movie Version) – 3:27
 "03 Bonnie & Clyde" (Explicit) – 3:26
 "U Don't Know" (Remix) (Jay-Z & M.O.P.) – 4:28

CD single

 "03 Bonnie & Clyde" (Radio Edit) – 3:28
 "U Don't Know" (Remix) – 4:27
 "03 Bonnie & Clyde" (Instrumental) – 3:27

Credits and personnel 
Adapted from The Blueprint 2: The Gift & the Curse's liner notes.

E-Base – bass, guitar, instrumentation, Keyboards
Shawn Carter – vocals (rap), composer
Jason Goldstein – mixing
D. Harper – composer
Gimel "Young Guru" Katon – engineer, mixing
Beyoncé Knowles – vocals
Prince Nelson – additional writing from sample

R. Rouse – composer
Tupac Shakur – additional writing from sample
Kanye West – composer, producer
Shane "Bermy" Woodley – engineer
Tyrone Wrice – composer

Charts and certifications

Weekly charts

Year-end charts

Certifications

See also 
 "'97 Bonnie & Clyde," 1998 song by Eminem

References 

2002 singles
Beyoncé songs
Songs about Bonnie and Clyde
Jay-Z songs
Kanye West songs
Music videos directed by Chris Robinson (director)
Number-one singles in Switzerland
Roc-A-Fella Records singles
Song recordings produced by Kanye West
Songs written by Jay-Z
Songs written by Kanye West
Songs written by Prince (musician)